This article is a catalog of actresses and models who have appeared on the cover of Elle Kazakhstan, the Kazakhstani edition of Elle magazine.

2015

2016

2017

External links
 Elle Kazakhstan (archived)
 Elle Kazakhstan at Models.com

Kazakhstan